Fauna of Denmark may refer to:

 List of birds of Denmark
 List of mammals of Denmark
 List of amphibians and reptiles of Denmark

See also
 Outline of Denmark – country located in Scandinavia of Northern Europe